This is a list of ecoregions in Nepal

Terrestrial ecoregions
Most of Nepal is in the Indomalayan realm. The highest portions of the Himalaya are in the Palearctic realm. Ecoregions are listed by biome.

Tropical and subtropical moist broadleaf forests
 Himalayan subtropical broadleaf forests
 Lower Gangetic Plains moist deciduous forests
 Upper Gangetic Plains moist deciduous forests

Tropical and subtropical coniferous forests
 Himalayan subtropical pine forests

Temperate broadleaf and mixed forests
 Eastern Himalayan broadleaf forests
 Western Himalayan broadleaf forests

Temperate coniferous forests
 Eastern Himalayan subalpine conifer forests
 Western Himalayan subalpine conifer forests

Tropical and subtropical grasslands, savannas, and shrublands
 Terai-Duar savanna and grasslands

Montane grasslands and shrublands
 Eastern Himalayan alpine shrub and meadows (Palearctic)
 Western Himalayan alpine shrub and meadows (Palearctic)

Freshwater ecoregions
 Upper Brahmaputra
 Ganges Himalayan Foothills
 Ganges Delta and Plain

References

 
Nepal
ecoregions